Damien Patrick Nygaard (born 24 May 1945) is a retired Australian athlete. He played 96 South Australian National Football League (SANFL) matches with Norwood and made three appearances for South Australia between 1964 and 1969. Nygaard is probably best remembered by most for his collision with Glenelg hard-man Neil Kerley in 1969 where he sustained a broken jaw.

He finished his Australian football career with West Perth, where despite being a much hyped recruit, he failed to live up to his expected promise. Despite this, Nygaard tried his hand at the American gridiron in 1974, as punter with the National Football League's Green Bay Packers, more than fifteen years before a more successful conversion by Darren Bennett.

External links

1945 births
Living people
Australian rules footballers from South Australia
Norwood Football Club players
West Perth Football Club players
Australian players of American football
Green Bay Packers players